XHSAV-FM is a radio station on 92.7 FM in San Andrés Tuxtla, Veracruz, Mexico, known as La Primerísima.

History
XHSAV received its concession on June 13, 1991. It was owned by Mario Daniel Malpica Valverde and transferred to the current concessionaire in 2003.

References

Radio stations in Veracruz
Radio stations established in 1991